Reed Gym is a 3,214-seat multi-purpose arena in the western United States, on the campus of Idaho State University in Pocatello, Idaho. Opened  in 1951, it is the home court of the ISU Bengals men's and women's basketball and volleyball teams of the Big Sky Conference.  The home of the men's and women's tennis teams, Reed also serves as a student recreational center.

Prior to the opening of the ASISU Minidome (Holt Arena) in 1970, the men's basketball team played at Reed Gym and enjoyed considerable success in the 1950s under head coaches Steve Belko and  In 1957, the gym was the site of the play-in game for the West Regionals of the NCAA tournament; the Bengals defeated Hardin-Simmons of Texas by nine points and improved their record  When Gus Johnson and the Idaho Vandals visited in 1963, a capacity crowd of 4,900 saw the battle for the King Spud Trophy and unofficial state title.

Men's basketball returned to Reed full-time for the 2019–20 season, citing the "positive difference" created by the intimate environment.

See also
 List of NCAA Division I basketball arenas

References

External links
 Official website

Idaho State Bengals men's basketball
Sports venues in Idaho
College basketball venues in the United States
Indoor arenas in Idaho
Buildings and structures in Bannock County, Idaho
Tourist attractions in Bannock County, Idaho